Eshan may refer to:

 Eshan Yi Autonomous County, Yuxi, Yunnan Province, China
 Eshan Hilal, Indian belly dancer
 Eshan Nayeck (died 1987), Mauritian convicted murderer

See also
 Eshani, a town and union council of Barkhan District, Balochistan, Pakistan
 Eshen, Iran